{{DISPLAYTITLE:5-HT1D receptor}}

5-hydroxytryptamine (serotonin) receptor 1D, also known as HTR1D, is a 5-HT receptor, but also denotes the human gene encoding it. 5-HT1D acts on the central nervous system, and affects locomotion and anxiety. It also induces vasoconstriction in the brain.

Tissue distribution and function
5HT1D receptors are found at low levels in the basal ganglia (globus pallidus, substantia nigra, caudate putamen), the hippocampus, and in the cortex.

Structure
5HT1D receptor is a G protein linked receptor that activates an intracellular messenger cascade to produce an inhibitory response by decreasing cellular levels of cAMP. The 5HT1D is a 7-TM receptor. A large intercellular loop between TM-5 and TM-6 is believed to be associated with coupling to a second messenger. Agonists might bind in a manner that utilizes an aspartate residue in TM-3 and residues in the TM-4, TM-5 and TM-6. A human clone containing an intronless open reading frame was found to encode 377 amino acids of the 5HT1D receptor. The gene has been localized on chromosome 1, region 1p34.3-36.3

Ligands

Agonists
Molecular modelling has provided a picture of the agonistic binding site of 5HT1D. The amino acid residues within the receptor binding site region have been identified. This is a valuable guide to design potential 5HT1D receptor agonists.
When sumatriptan binds there is major conformational change in both ligand and receptor in the binding pocket.

 5-(Nonyloxy)tryptamine
 Sumatriptan (vasoconstrictor in migraine)
 Ergotamine (vasoconstrictor in migraine)
 5-Carboxamidotryptamine (5-CT)
 5-(t-Butyl)-N-methyltryptamine
 CP-135,807
 CP-286,601
 PNU-109,291 ((S)-3,4-Dihydro-1-[2-[4-(4-methoxyphenyl)-1-piperazinyl]ethyl]-N-methyl-1H-2-benzopyran-6-carboxamide)
 PNU-142,633 ((1S)-1-[2-[4-[4-(Aminocarbonyl)phenyl]-1-piperazinyl]ethyl]-3,4-dihydro-N-methyl-1H-2-benzopyran-6-carboxamide)
 GR-46611 (3-[3-(2-Dimethylaminoethyl)-1H-indol-5-yl]-N-(4-methoxybenzyl)acrylamide)
 L-694,247 (2-[5-[3-(4-Methylsulfonylamino)benzyl-1,2,4-oxadiazol-5-yl]-1H-indol-3-yl]ethanamine)
 L-772,405

Antagonists
 Ziprasidone (atypical antipsychotic) 
 Methiothepin (antipsychotic)
 Yohimbine (aphrodisiac)
 Metergoline
 BRL-15572
 Vortioxetine (antidepressant)
 GR-127,935 (mixed 5-HT1B/1D antagonist)
 LY-310,762
 LY-367,642
 LY-456,219
 LY-456,220

See also 
 5-HT1 receptor
 5-HT receptor

References

External links

Further reading 

 
 
 
 
 
 
 
 

Serotonin receptors